The 2019–20 Anaheim Ducks season was the 27th season for the National Hockey League franchise that was established on June 15, 1993. The Ducks missed the playoffs for consecutive seasons for the first time since the 2001–02 season.

The season was suspended by the league officials on March 12, 2020, after several other professional and collegiate sports organizations followed suit as a result of the ongoing COVID-19 pandemic. On May 26, the NHL regular season was officially declared over with the remaining games being cancelled. When the season ended, the Ducks ranked sixth in the Pacific Division and had a record of 29–33–9. This is the first time since the 2001–02 season that the Ducks missed the playoffs for consecutive years.

Standings

Divisional standings

Western Conference

Tiebreaking procedures
 Fewer number of games played (only used during regular season).
 Greater number of regulation wins (denoted by RW).
 Greater number of wins in regulation and overtime (excluding shootout wins; denoted by ROW).
 Greater number of total wins (including shootouts).
 Greater number of points earned in head-to-head play; if teams played an uneven number of head-to-head games, the result of the first game on the home ice of the team with the extra home game is discarded.
 Greater goal differential (difference between goals for and goals against).
 Greater number of goals scored (denoted by GF).

Schedule and results

Preseason
The preseason schedule was published on June 13, 2019.

Regular season
The regular season schedule was released on June 25, 2019.

Player statistics

Skaters

Goaltenders

†Denotes player spent time with another team before joining the Ducks. Stats reflect time with the Ducks only.
‡Denotes player was traded mid-season. Stats reflect time with the Ducks only.
Bold/italics denotes franchise record.

References

Anaheim Ducks seasons
Anaheim Ducks
Ducks
Ducks